de Févin is a French surname. Notable people with the surname include:

Antoine de Févin ( 1470–1511/12), Franco-Flemish composer
Robert de Févin (1450–1515), his brother and colleague-composer

French-language surnames